Moscow State Forest University (MSFU) is a specialized establishment of higher education which trains engineering personnel, scientists as well as bachelors and masters for forest industry, wood processing and pulp and paper industry and is the major educational and scientific center of forest complex of the country. One school (commonly called in Russia "a faculty", and is similar to a college within a university) of the university prepares specialists for aerospace industry.

Established in 1919 as the Moscow Forest Engineering Institute, the school was Russia's "first higher education institution for training forest engineers."

There are nine schools (colleges) in university specialized in forest engineering and one school (college) specialized in electronics, applied mathematics and computer science Faculty of Computer Science (FEST). FEST was founded in 1959 on initiative by academician Sergey Pavlovich Korolev with the goal to prepare engineers for the Soviet Aerospace industry. Graduates of the school occupy senior research and management positions within Russian Space Agency and its affiliates; a number of cosmonauts graduated from the school.      

Since 2016 Moscow State Forest University is a division of Bauman Moscow State Technical University, BMSTU (Russian: Московский государственный технический университет им. Н. Э. Баумана (МГТУ им. Н. Э. Баумана)), sometimes colloquially referred to as the Bauman School or Baumanka (Russian: Ба́уманка) is a public technical university (Polytechnic) located in Moscow, Russia. Bauman University is the oldest and largest Russian technical university offering B.S., M.S. and PhD degrees in various engineering fields and applied sciences.

See also 
 List of historic schools of forestry

References

External links
 

 
Forestry education
Universities and institutes established in the Soviet Union
Forestry in Russia
Mytishchinsky District
History of forestry education